Antti Nieminen (12 March 1928 – 24 October 1972) was a Finnish footballer. He played in one match for the Finland national football team in 1960.

References

1928 births
1972 deaths
Finnish footballers
Finland international footballers
Place of birth missing
Association footballers not categorized by position